The El Paso/Juarez Gamecocks were a professional soccer team that played one season in the United Soccer League. They played 6 games in the USL's 1985 League Cup before folding. The entire league collapsed after only one regular season game had been played. For their part, the team paid off all debts, and the player's salaries through the end of the month before releasing them all from their contracts. The Gamecocks were owned by Pedro Meneses, who also founded Juarez City's first television station, XEJ-TDT (Channel 50).

1985 standings

Management
 Pedro Meneses, Owner
 Luis Garcia, Operations Manager
 José "Che" Gómez, Head Coach

Players
Leroy Alexandre, G
 Gustavo Beltran
 Miguel Carcamo, MF
 Arnaldo Correa, MF
 Jesus Gonzalez, D
 Edgardo Lopez Baez
 Eduardo Linares, D
Josue Portillo Escarcega, F
 Manny Rojas, M
 Juan Carlos "Willy" Villalobos, G

Team leaders

Scoring

Goalkeeping

External links
 Team Stats

References

USL info

Defunct soccer clubs in Texas
Sports in El Paso, Texas
United Soccer League (1984–85) teams
1985 establishments in Texas
1985 disestablishments in Texas
Association football clubs established in 1985
Association football clubs disestablished in 1985
Sport in Ciudad Juárez